The C.L. Sailor House is a historic house at Wilson and Wiley Streets in Bigelow, Arkansas.  It is a -story wood-frame structure, its walls a combination of brick and composition shingles, set on a stone foundation.  Its dominant feature is a wraparound porch, supported by paneled posts set on brick piers.  Built in 1917, it is a distinctive blend of Colonial Revival and Craftsman styling.  C.L. Sailor, for whom it was built, was general manager of the Bayou Fourche Lumber Company, and owned two area newspapers.

The house was listed on the National Register of Historic Places in 1998.

See also
National Register of Historic Places listings in Perry County, Arkansas

References

Houses on the National Register of Historic Places in Arkansas
Colonial Revival architecture in Arkansas
Houses completed in 1917
1917 establishments in Arkansas
American Craftsman architecture in Arkansas